The Brothers is a group of small islands in Cook Strait, New Zealand, off the east coast of Arapaoa Island. 

The Brothers form two small island groups, each containing one main island and a number of tiny islets. The main islands are simply called North Brother and South Brother. Most of the smaller islets lie in a small arc south of North Brother, with the largest being only some one hectare in area.

The Māori name for the group, Ngāwhatu-kai-ponu, literally means "the eyes that witnessed", and the islands are considered tapu to the Māori.

North Brother Island is a sanctuary for a rare reptile subspecies, the Brothers Island tuatara (Sphenodon punctatus guntheri), and is the type locality for a rare beetle species, the Cook Strait click beetle (Amychus granulatus), although the latter is possibly extinct there now.

See also

 List of islands of New Zealand
 List of islands
 Desert island

References

External links 

 Brothers Island Lighthouse at Maritime New Zealand

Brothers
Brothers
Cook Strait
Lighthouses in New Zealand